Charlottenlund Racetrack is a harness racing track in the town of Charlottenlund in the Capital Region of Denmark.  

The racetrack, nicknamed Lunden,  was established in 1891 by the Danish Trotting Club (Det Danske Travselskab). The annual major events at Charlottenlund Racetrack are the Danish Trotting Derby and international Copenhagen Cup.

Cultural references
Charlottenlund Racecourse has been used as a location in the following films:.
 Odds 777 (1932)
 Moster fra Mols (1943)
 De røde heste - 1950 (1950)
 Der var engang en gade (1957)
 De røde heste - 1968 (1968)
 Olsen-bandens store kup (1972)
 Nitten røde roser (1974)
 Kampen om den røde ko (1987)
 Tarok (2013)

References

External links 
Charlottenlund Travbane official homepage

Harness racing venues in Denmark
Sports venues in Copenhagen
Horse racing venues in Denmark